Marcel Gagnon (born April 19, 1936) is a former Canadian politician. A businessman, he served as a legislator for both the National Assembly of Quebec and the House of Commons.

Provincial politics

Gagnon ran as a Parti Québécois candidate in 1976 in the provincial riding of Champlain.  He was elected with 41% of the vote.  He was re-elected in 1981 with 54% of the vote, but was defeated in 1985 with 44% of the vote and finished third in 1989 as an Independent candidate with 19% of the vote.

Federal politics

He entered federal politics when he was elected as a Member of the Bloc Québécois in 2000 in the riding of Champlain, with 45.3% of the vote against Liberal Julie Boulet (45.2%).  He was re-elected in 2004 in the riding of Saint-Maurice—Champlain with 55% of the vote.

During his tenure, he served as the Bloc critic to Seniors and proposed that eligible recipients be signed up to the Guaranteed Income Supplement Program (GIS) without having to make a request.

At one point, Gagnon was critic to the Library of Parliament, the Minister of Agriculture and Agri-Food.  He did not run for re-election in 2006, retiring from office at the dissolution of parliament.

External links
 
 

1936 births
Living people
Members of the House of Commons of Canada from Quebec
Bloc Québécois MPs
Parti Québécois MNAs
21st-century Canadian politicians